The big lie is a propaganda technique used for political purpose.

Big Lie may also refer to:

Books
The Big Lie, a 1991 children's novel by David Day
The Big Lie, a 2008 book by Anthony Neilson
The Big Lie, 2015 novel by Julie Mayhew which won the Sidewise Award for Alternate History
The Big Lie: Exposing the Nazi Roots of the American Left, a 2017 book by Dinesh D'Souza
The Big Lie: Election Chaos, Political Opportunism, and the State of American Politics After 2020, a 2022 book by Jonathan Lemire

Film and television
The Big Lie (1951 film), a US Army anti-communist propaganda film
The Big Lie (1956 film) (Spanish: La gran mentira), a Spanish film directed by Rafael Gil  
The Big Lie (2012 film) , an Israeli social drama film
The Big Lie (2016 film), an American documentary
"The Big Lie", a 1992 pilot episode of McGee and Me!
"The Big Lie" (Voltron: The Third Dimension), a 1999 episode of Voltron: The Third Dimension

Music
"The Big Lie", a song by Gigolo Aunts
"Big Lie" (Post Malone song), 2016
"The Big Lie", a 1965 song by Gene Chandler, B-side of "Nothing Can Stop Me"

Other
The big lie, Adolf Hitler’s coining of the term and use in Nazi Germany
The big lie, Donald Trump's false claim of a stolen election

See also
9/11: The Big Lie, a book by Thierry Meyssan about the September 11 attacks